The Consul-General of Australia in New York represents the Australian Government in New York City. 

The Consulate-General is responsible for raising awareness of Asia-Pacific issues in the United States through contacts with New York-based media, think tanks, educational institutions and cultural organisations. The Consulate provides consular and passport services, as well as visiting and reporting responsibilities on behalf of the Australian Ambassador in Washington, in the jurisdictions of New York, New Jersey, Pennsylvania, Connecticut, Rhode Island, Massachusetts, Vermont, Maine, New Hampshire, Ohio, Puerto Rico and the US Virgin Islands.

Consuls-General

See also
 Australia–United States relations
 Embassy of Australia, Washington, D.C.
 List of ambassadors of Australia to the United States
 Embassy of the United States, Canberra
 List of ambassadors of the United States to Australia
 List of diplomatic missions in the United States
 List of diplomatic missions of Australia

References

External links
Australian Consulate-General, New York

 
New York
Australia
Consuls-General